Saint-Georges-sur-l'Aa (literally Saint-Georges on the Aa) is a commune in the Nord department in northern France.

See also
Communes of the Nord department

References

Saintgeorgessurlaa
French Flanders